Julia Ioffe (born 18 October 1982) is a Russian-born American journalist. Her articles have appeared in The Washington Post, The New York Times, The New Yorker, Foreign Policy, Forbes, Bloomberg Businessweek, The New Republic, Politico, and The Atlantic. Ioffe has appeared on television programs on MSNBC, CBS, PBS and other news channels as a Russia expert. She is the Washington correspondent for the website Puck.

Early life and education
Ioffe was born in Moscow, to a Russian Jewish family. On April 28, 1990, when she was 7, she and her family immigrated to the United States. They settled in Columbia, Maryland, where she grew up. Ioffe attended Beth Tfiloh Dahan Community School from which she graduated in 2001.

Ioffe graduated with a degree in Soviet history from Princeton University in 2005. Her thesis, "Selling Utopia: Soviet Propaganda and the Spanish Civil War", was supervised by Jan T. Gross.

While at Princeton, Ioffe was vice-president of the Princeton Israel Public Affairs Committee. In a college newspaper column published in 2003, she was quoted as supporting Israel's "methods of defense against terrorism", including the construction of the Israeli West Bank Wall. According to Ioffe, the wall was "necessary for Israel to protect its citizens against suicide bombers".

Career

Ioffe worked for the Columbia Journalism School's Knight Case Studies Initiative.

In March 2018, Ecco, an imprint of HarperCollins, announced a book deal with Ioffe. The book, Russia Girl, was slated for publication in 2020; as of April 2022 it was due in 2023.

Ioffe is the Washington correspondent for the website Puck.

The New Yorker and Foreign Policy
In 2009, Ioffe won a Fulbright Scholarship to work in Russia.  Ioffe spent three years in Moscow, from 2009 to 2012, working as a correspondent for The New Yorker and Foreign Policy.

Ioffe's profile of Alexey Navalny, then a lawyer and anti-corruption activist, was published in the April 4, 2011, issue of The New Yorker.

Ioffe covered protests and the political manoeuvring surrounding Vladimir Putin's return to the presidency, in her column “Kremlinology 2012,” which was published in Foreign Policy.

In February 2012, The New Yorker published her profile of Mikhail Prokhorov, then the third-richest man in Russia who contested the 2012 presidential elections. “Are Putin and Prokhorov running for President against or with each other?” Ioffe asked in the profile.

During the most violent protest, which took place on May 6, 2012, the day before Putin's inauguration, Ioffe took a photo of a small boy on a bicycle with training wheels, facing a row of Russian riot police. The image was widely seen.

The New Republic
In 2012, Ioffe returned to the U.S. and became a senior editor for The New Republic in Washington, D.C.
At The New Republic, Ioffe wrote about American politics, including about a brewing civil war within the Republican Party. Her 2013 profile of Kentucky Republican Senator Rand Paul was a finalist for the Livingston Award. She also covered the protests in Ferguson, Missouri in 2014.

In 2013, Ioffe wrote about contracting whooping cough, although she had been vaccinated against the disease in childhood. She blamed the anti-vaxxer community for her illness.

Ioffe continued writing about Russia, including about the 2013 anti-gay laws and the Kremlin's ban on American adoptions of Russian children. In 2013, Ioffe visited Moscow to document what happened to the opposition after the 2012 crackdown. Among others, she interviewed Alexey Navalny, future presidential candidate Ksenia Sobchak, and members of Pussy Riot. Her article, “The Loneliness of Vladimir Putin,” appeared in The New Republic in February 2014.

While covering the 2014 Sochi Olympics for The New Republic, Ioffe traveled to Ukraine, where pro-Western protestors had toppled the Moscow-friendly president. She  predicted that Russia would invade Eastern Ukraine after its annexation of Crimea. She also traveled to Eastern Ukraine to cover the war in Donbas.

In December 2014, Ioffe was one of the many staff members at The New Republic to resign in protest against owner Chris Hughes's planned changes at the magazine. Her emails and comments were cited by Ryan Lizza in an article for The New Yorker about the changes at The New Republic.

The New York Times Magazine
In January 2015, Ioffe joined The New York Times Magazine as a contributor.

Politico
In May 2016, Ioffe became a contributing writer at Politico.

In December 2016, Politico fired Ioffe within hours after she posted to Twitter speculating about Trump behaving inappropriately with his daughter Ivanka. Ioffe tweeted the following about President-Elect Donald J. Trump and his daughter Ivanka: "Either Trump is fucking his daughter or he's shirking nepotism laws. Which is worse?" The tweet had included a link to Trump's a CNN news article claiming the president elect was planning to assign the East Wing of the White House, traditionally the First Lady's domain, to his eldest daughter Ivanka.  The news article was later determined to be false with CNN publishing a retraction. After deleting the tweet from her page, Ioffe tweeted several apologies.

The Atlantic, which had recently hired Ioffe for a position to start a few weeks later, issued a statement addressing Ioffe's comments, saying, "We're confident that when she joins The Atlantic next month she will adhere to our standards".

The Atlantic
On 6 December 2016, The Atlantic announced that it was hiring Ioffe to cover national security, foreign policy, and politics, with editor-in-chief Jeffrey Goldberg describing her as "an indefatigable reporter, a gifted analyst, and an elegant writer". Ioffe joined The Atlantic in early 2017.

She wrote about The Atlantic obtaining a 10-month correspondence between Donald Trump Jr. and WikiLeaks, which played a pivotal role in the presidential campaign and was suspected by the US intelligence community of being "chosen by the Russian government to disseminate the information it had hacked". Ioffe wrote that "though Trump Jr. mostly ignored the frequent messages from WikiLeaks, he at times appears to have acted on its requests… and shared that information with Donald Trump’s senior campaign officials".

Ioffe gained access to the entire e-mail correspondence between Trump's campaign chief Paul Manafort and Oleg Deripaska, a Russian oligarch with strong ties to the Kremlin. According to the piece: "Manafort attempted to leverage his leadership role in the Trump campaign to curry favor with a Russian oligarch close to Vladimir Putin".

Other coverage of Donald and Melania Trump
In April 2016, Ioffe published a profile of Melania Trump for GQ magazine that revealed Melania Trump had a half-brother with whom the family was not in contact. Slate magazine characterized the profile as "generally positive" of Trump. Melania Trump, however, wrote in a Facebook post: "There are numerous inaccuracies in this article ... My parents are private citizens and should not be subject to Ms. Ioffe's unfair scrutiny." Ioffe responded to CBS News saying: "I think she's understandably upset that some dirty laundry came out, but I did my job." Ioffe's profile was praised by Slate and Erik Wemple, while Fox News writer Howard Kurtz said it had a "condescending tone". Maxim magazine said that it "smacked of politically-motivated contempt for Donald Trump masked as a 'probing' look at his glamorous wife". Following the article's publication, Ioffe received numerous anti-Semitic and threatening messages. In an interview, Melania Trump said that Ioffe "provoked" the anti-Semitic abuse she later received with her article.

On October 29, 2018, Ioffe appeared on CNN's The Lead with Jake Tapper, where  she took part in a discussion about President Trump's rhetoric in the wake of the Pittsburgh synagogue shooting. She opined that, "this president has radicalized so many more people than ISIS ever did", pointing to a 60% rise in antisemitic attacks during 2017. The comment received pushback from fellow panelists David Urban and Mona Charen. Ioffe later apologized for the comment during the broadcast and on Twitter calling her comments "hyperbole". In a Fox News interview with Laura Ingraham, Trump called Ioffe "some kind of a sick woman".

Coverage of Russia  
Ioffe appears on national and cable channels as a Russia expert. Since 2013, she has been a guest of Morning Joe, All In with Chris Hayes, Hardball, The Rachel Maddow Show and The 11th Hour with Brian Williams on MSBNC, The Lead with Jake Tapper on CNN, Real Time with Bill Maher on HBO, The Daily Show, The Colbert Report, and The Opposition on Comedy Central.

Argument with Lawrence O'Donnell 
On August 7, 2013, Ioffe was involved in an argument with Lawrence O'Donnell over Putin's control of Russian media. Ioffe alleged that, instead of letting her answer his questions, O'Donnell "interrupted and harangued and mansplained" to her.

The next day, Ioffe responded with a post on The New Republics website, "Dear Lawrence O'Donnell, Don't Mansplain to Me About Russia", in which she stated that she had spent several years reporting from Russia, was a native speaker, and had been invited and introduced as an expert on Russia. "What bothers me is that, look: your producers take the time to find experts to come on the show, answer your questions, and, hopefully, clarify the issue at hand".

The post started a wide discussion about several aspects of the interaction between television and online media. Joe Coscarelli of New York magazine wrote that "[Ioffe's] simple, bullet-pointed list of arguments would never be allowed on cable television because they reveal an ability to think outside a black or white, good or bad, America or Russia dichotomy". Philip Bump of The Atlantic assumed that it's "impossible to win a TV Argument in an Internet World", that "the power distinction between host and guest became flexible… [because] they interact both on-air and off" and "nearly any writing online could similarly rise to national attention" like Ioffe's.

Arkansas Democrat-Gazette incident 
In November 2019, Ioffe accused a writer on the Arkansas Democrat-Gazette on Twitter of being a Russian troll after noticing one of its stories about Hunter Biden used a symbol that she mistakenly identified as a Russian-style quotation mark. After her mistake was pointed out to her, Ioffe deleted her tweets and tweeted an apology.

2022 Frontline PBS interview and program 
On 3 March she was interviewed by Mike Wiser; on 15 March 2022 this interview appeared in a Frontline episode titled "Putin's Road to War". She discussed Russia's invasion of Ukraine and said that Putin had miscalculated the Russian people's support for, and opposition to, the invasion.

Bibliography

 
 
 
 
 
 
 
 
 * 
 
 
 
 
 
 
 
 
 
 
 
 
 
 
 
 
 
 
 
 
 
 
 
 
 
 
 
 
 
 
 
 
 
   
 After Vanity Fair magazine had published the article about Yulia Navalny, the wife of politician Alexei Navalny, written by Yulia Ioffe, Meduza published a translation of the article rewritten by

Notes

External links
 Julia Ioffe articles at Puck website
 Julia Ioffe Biography at Russia! magazine
 

1982 births
Living people
Journalists from Moscow
Journalists from Maryland
American reporters and correspondents
American foreign correspondents
American people of Russian-Jewish descent
American political journalists
American magazine journalists
American women journalists
CNN people
Fulbright alumni
Jewish American journalists
People from Columbia, Maryland
Politico people
Princeton University alumni
Soviet emigrants to the United States
Soviet Jews
The Atlantic (magazine) people
The New Republic people
The New Yorker people
21st-century American journalists
21st-century American Jews